The Proud Tower: A Portrait of the World Before the War, 1890-1914 is a 1966 book by Barbara Tuchman, consisting of a collection of essays she had published in various periodicals during the mid-1960s. It followed the publication of the highly successful book The Guns of August (published in Britain as August 1914). Each chapter deals with a different country, theme, and time (although all relate to the approximately 25 years preceding World War I).  Two chapters are about British governments in 1895 and 1910; one chapter is dedicated to the Dreyfus Affair in France; and another is nominally about the Wilhelmine politics of late 19th-century Germany, but is really about German music and culture in that period.  Other chapters cover the United States (particularly the efforts of Thomas Reed, Speaker of the House, to overcome the tyranny of the absent quorum), the Hague Conventions of 1899 and 1907, the anarchist movement of the late 19th and early 20th centuries, and the activities of the Socialist International and trade unions.

The title of the book is derived from the 1845 Edgar Allan Poe poem "The City in the Sea". Two lines of the poem are used as the epigraph for the book: "While from a proud tower in the town/ Death looks gigantically down."

Publication history
Hardcover, Macmillan, 1966
Mass-market paperback, Bantam Books, 1982
Paperback, Ballantine Books, New York, 1996

External links
"'Proud Tower' Still Provides a Sharp-Eyed View", review by Jonathan Yardley, The Washington Post, March 16, 2009; Page C01

1966 non-fiction books
History books about the United Kingdom
History books about France
History books about Germany
History books about the United States
History books about the 19th century
History books about the 20th century
20th-century history books
Macmillan Publishers books
Essay collections
Pulitzer Prize for General Non-Fiction-winning works